Purnima Rau (born 30 January 1967) is an Indian former cricketer and current cricket coach. She played as an all-rounder, batting right-handed and bowling right-arm off break. She appeared in five Test matches and 33 One Day Internationals for India between 1993 and 2000. She played domestic cricket for Andhra, Railways and Air India.

Playing career
Rau made her international debut for India against West Indies in an ODI at Nottingham on 20 July 1993. Her Test debut came against New Zealand at Nelson on 7 February 1995. Rau was described as one of the first players in Indian women's cricket to attempt to take advantage of the field restrictions in place during the first 15 overs of a limited overs game.

She captained India in 3 Test matches and 8 ODI matches, all in 1995.

In 1996 skipper Rau helped the touring Andhra Pradesh women's cricket team register a 114 run victory over Samudra Ladies CC. She captained Air India in the 1999/00 season.

Coaching career
Rau was head coach of India between 2014 and 2017. Currently, she is a coach associated with development of youth and women's cricketers in Hyderabad.

References

External links
 
 

1967 births
Living people
People from Secunderabad
Indian women cricketers
India women Test cricketers
India women One Day International cricketers
Indian women cricket captains
Andhra women cricketers
Railways women cricketers
Air India women cricketers
Indian cricket coaches